Opossum Creek (also called Possum Creek) is a stream in Franklin County in the U.S. state of Missouri. It is a tributary of Big Creek.
 
Opossum Creek was named for the abundance of opossums along its course.

See also
List of rivers of Missouri

References

Rivers of Franklin County, Missouri
Rivers of Missouri